Madhyamgram railway station is a Kolkata Suburban Railway station in the town of Madhyamgram. It serves the local areas of Madhyamgram, Badu and Sajirhat in the North 24 Parganas district, West Bengal, India.

History
In 1882–84 the Bengal Central Railway Company constructed two lines: one from Dum Dum to Khulna, now in Bangladesh, via Bangaon and the other linking Ranaghat and Bangaon. The Madhyamgram railway station lies in the Dum Dum–Bangaon section and was opened in 1906..

Electrification 
The Sealah–Dum Dum–Barasat–Ashok Nagar–Bangaon sector was electrified in 1972.

Station complex

The structure of the station is not so large. There is only one entrance in platform no. 1. The computerised ticket counter is present in platform no. 1. All the Sealdah and Dum Dum-bound trains arrive at platform no.1 and all the Bangaon, Gobardanga, Thakurnagar, Habra, Duttapukur, Basirhat and Hasnabad-bound trains arrive at platform no. 2 and 3. There are many food stalls and vendors on both the platforms. A foot overbridge connects the two platforms. A level crossing exists at the southernmost end of the railway station. There is a road overbridge to the north of the station and to the south, there exists the bridge over the Noai Canal.

Station layout

Metro Railway

Extension plan from Noapara to Barasat 

The proposed Metro railway extension (Line 4) alignment pass through Dum Dum Cantonment and Jessore Road up to Biman Bandar station. From there, the line would run under Jessore Road until New Barrackpore before reaching the surface at Madhyamgram station. From Madhyamgram to Barasat, the alignment would be elevated. However, for crossing the existing road overbridge at Madhyamgram and Barasat, the alignment would descend gradually to ground level and rise again on viaduct. This is supposed to be beneficial for the people of North 24 Parganas district and will bring them closer to Kolkata's Business district. This would reduce the heavy pressure on Sealdah–Barasat section of Eastern Railways. The Madhyamgram Metro railway station is to be constructed in the Madhyamgram–Barasat section.

Work for the Noapara–Barasat (via NSC Bose Airport) metro extension has come to a halt as construction giant L&T has pulled out of the 17 km metro corridor project. L&T was unable to get on with the work due to the encroachment on railway land. L&T has moved out all major equipment from the project site at Barasat and has closed down two of the three site offices. The lone site office is locked.

See also

References

External links
 Madhyamgram railway station map
 

Sealdah railway division
Railway stations in North 24 Parganas district
Railway stations opened in 1906
Kolkata Suburban Railway stations
1906 establishments in India